The National Sports Awards is the collective name given to the six sports awards of Republic of India. It is awarded annually by the Ministry of Youth Affairs and Sports. They are presented by the President of India in the same ceremony at the Rashtrapati Bhavan usually on 29th August each year along with the national adventure award. , a total of eight hundred and twenty-seven individuals have been awarded the various National Sports Awards in Olympic sports. The four awards presented in Olympic sports are Major Dhyan Chand Khel Ratna Award, Arjuna Award, Dhyan Chand Award and Dronacharya Award.

First presented in the year 1961, a total of six hundred and twenty-nine individuals have been honoured with the Arjuna Award in Olympic sports for their "good performance at the international level" over the period of last four years, with twenty individuals being awarded for their lifetime contribution. First presented in the year 1985, a total of hundred coaches have been honoured with the Dronacharya Award in Olympic sports for their "outstanding work on a consistent basis and enabling sportspersons to excel in international events" over the period of last four years, with thirty coaches being awarded in the lifetime contribution category. First presented in the year 1994–1995, a total of thirty-one sportspersons have been honoured with the Rajiv Gandhi Khel Ratna, the highest sporting honour of India, in Olympic sports for their "most outstanding performance at the international level" over the period of last four years. First presented in the year 2002, a total of sixty-seven retired sportspersons have been honoured with the Dhyan Chand Award, the lifetime achievement sporting honour of India, in Olympic sports for their "good performance at the international level and their continued contributions to the promotion of sports even after their career as a sportsperson is over." Five awardees have been honoured posthumously including Sachin Nag, who was awarded Dhyan Chand Award posthumously in the year 2020 in the discipline of swimming.

Recipients

Archery

Athletics

Aquatics

Badminton

Basketball

Boxing

Cycling

Equestrian

Fencing

Football

Golf

Gymnastics

Hockey

Judo

Lawn Tennis

Rowing

Shooting

Table Tennis

Volleyball

Weightlifting

Winter Sports

Wrestling

Reference

External links
Official Website

Indian sports trophies and awards
Ministry of Youth Affairs and Sports